HMNZS Kahu (P3571) was a Fairmile B motor launch of the Royal New Zealand Navy.

Originally commissioned on 20 December 1943, with the pendant number Q 411, she was part of the 80th Motor Launch Flotilla. Early in 1944, she went to the Solomon Islands where she served under the operational control of COMSOPAC.

She was recommissioned from 1947 to 1965 as HMNZS Kahu I (P3571)

See also
 
 New Zealand Coastal Forces of World War II

References

Further reading

External links
 Wartime picture of ML Q 411 (Kahu I P3571) (scroll to bottom)

Patrol vessels of the Royal New Zealand Navy